"Miss Sun" is a 1980 hit for Boz Scaggs first recorded in 1977 by David Paich along with David Hungate, Steve Lukather and Jeff Porcaro.

Background
The four musicians were working as session musicians on Scaggs' Down Two Then Left album. They also worked on the self-titled album by Lisa Dalbello which was produced by David Foster. Dalbello - with whom Porcaro had formed a relationship - was invited to vocalize on the "Miss Sun" track, one of several demos which Lukather, Hungate, Paich and Porcaro cut at Davlen Studios. These demos led to the four musicians being signed to Columbia - Scaggs' label - as the nucleus of the group Toto. "Miss Sun" was never featured on an original Toto album - the demo track was released on Toto XX in 1998 - but in 1980 Scaggs cut the song with Bill Schnee producing and Hungate, Lukather, Paich and Porcaro providing backing: Dalbello chanced to then be in Los Angeles and was invited to replicate her vocal contribution to the original demo. Scaggs' version of "Miss Sun" (on which the single releases alone credit the songwriting to both Paich and Scaggs) was the only previously unreleased track on Scaggs' 1980 compilation album Hits! which would punctuate Scaggs' career as a regular album artist, his subsequent releases being spaced several years apart.

As a single, "Miss Sun" peaked at #14 in February 1981 and #13 Adult Contemporary. Billboard ranked it No. 99 in its year-end survey for 1981.

The Average White Band also cut the song a few months earlier for their 1980 album 'Shine' (produced by David Foster) but it was left off the initial release and not added until years later as a bonus track.

Personnel
Boz Scaggs - lead vocals
David Paich - keyboards, backing vocals, Moog bass
Steve Lukather - guitar
Jeff Porcaro - drums, percussion
Steve Porcaro - synthesizers
Lisa Dalbello - vocals

Chart history

Weekly charts

Year-end charts

References

1977 songs
1980 singles
Boz Scaggs songs
Toto (band) songs
Songs written by David Paich
Songs written by Jeff Porcaro
Songs written by Steve Lukather